The  is a writer's house museum established in Matsue, Shimane Prefecture, Japan in 1933. Lafcadio Hearn lived in Matsue from August 1890 to November 1891, and the museum was built next to his former residence, itself designated an Historic Site in 1940. The original museum was modelled on the Goethe-Nationalmuseum in Weimar, but it was rebuilt in a more traditional Japanese style in 1984. The museum attracts around 150,000 visitors a year.

References

External links
 Lafcadio Hearn Memorial Museum 
 The politics of nostalgia: museum representations of Lafcadio Hearn in Japan

Museums in Shimane Prefecture
Literary museums in Japan
Museums established in 1933
1933 establishments in Japan
Biographical museums in Japan